Chinese Venezuelans are people of Chinese ancestry who were born in or have immigrated to Venezuela. The country is home to nearly 400,000 Chinese. Almost all their businesses are related to the culinary field.

Demographics

Population

States with the highest proportions of Chinese-born population tend to be those of the Capital Region and Eastern Region. The states with the most population of Chinese-born people are also located in the central-north area.

At the 2011 census, this was the breakdown of Chinese-born population by state:

Communities with high percentages of Chinese-born people

See also
 China–Venezuela relations

References

External links
Venezuela's Sabor y Suerte in Chinese Food.

Venezuelan
Chinese diaspora in South America
Chinese Latin American
Ethnic groups in Venezuela